People's Deputy may refer to:

Member of the Congress of People's Deputies of the Soviet Union 
Member of the Congress of People's Deputies of Russia
Member of the Verkhovna Rada of Ukraine